The North Fork of the Grand River is a tributary of the Grand River, approximately 80 miles (129 km) long, in North Dakota and South Dakota in the United States.

It rises in the Badlands of southwestern North Dakota, in southern Bowman County, and flows ESE, into the Bowman-Haley Reservoir, formed by the Bowman-Haley Dam, then through northwestern South Dakota, past several units of the Grand River National Grassland in northern Perkins County. It joins the South Fork near Shadehill to form the Grand.

See also
List of rivers of North Dakota
List of rivers of South Dakota

External links

Rivers of North Dakota
Rivers of South Dakota
Bodies of water of Bowman County, North Dakota
Rivers of Perkins County, South Dakota